Halsall railway station was a railway station in the village of Halsall, Lancashire, on the Liverpool, Southport and Preston Junction Railway. Situated north of Carr Moss Lane, it opened on 1 November 1887 and closed on 26 September 1938. The tracks were lifted shortly after the line closed in 1952, though the station building survives as a private residence. The "Altcar Bob" service once operated through this station.

References

Sources
 Gell, Rob (1986). An Illustrated Survey of Railway Stations Between Southport & Liverpool 1848-1986. Heyday Publishing Company, .

External links 
 Halsall via Disused Stations
 The line and mileages via Railwaycodes

Disused railway stations in the Borough of West Lancashire
Former Lancashire and Yorkshire Railway stations
Railway stations in Great Britain opened in 1887
Railway stations in Great Britain closed in 1938
Halsall